Keynotes may refer to:
 Keynotes (Australian TV series)
 Keynotes (British game show)
 Keynotes (Canadian TV series)

See also
 Keynote (disambiguation)